Manfred Carstens (born 23 February 1943, in Molbergen) is a German politician of Christian Democratic Union of Germany (CDU).

Life 
In Emstek Carstens worked for a local bank. Carstens worked as a German politician for party CDU. From 1972 to 2005 Carstens was a member of German Bundestag. Carstens is married and has three children.

References

External links 
 German Bundestag: Biography of Carstens
 NordWestZeitung: Nur ein paar Stimmen fehlten (German)

Members of the Bundestag for Lower Saxony
Members of the Bundestag 2002–2005
Members of the Bundestag 1998–2002
Members of the Bundestag 1994–1998
Members of the Bundestag 1990–1994
Members of the Bundestag 1987–1990
Members of the Bundestag 1983–1987
Members of the Bundestag 1980–1983
Members of the Bundestag 1976–1980
Members of the Bundestag 1972–1976
1943 births
Living people
Members of the Bundestag for the Christian Democratic Union of Germany